Jablonka is a village and municipality in the Myjava District in the Trenčín Region of West Slovakia. The name Jablonka literally translates as a 'small apple tree', which can be explained by the large number of apple trees in and around the village.

History
In historical records the village was first mentioned in 1690 and was officially established in today's borders in 1955.

Geography
The municipality lies at an altitude of 290 metres and covers an area of 12.587 km2. It has a population of about 516 people.
The  small villages in Jablonka consist of U maliarikovci, U usiiacovci  and U michalickovci.

References

External links

  Official page
https://web.archive.org/web/20071027094149/http://www.statistics.sk/mosmis/eng/run.html

Villages and municipalities in Myjava District